Kevin Thomas (born September 10, 1984) is an American attorney and politician from the state of New York. A Democrat, Thomas has represented the 6th district in the New York State Senate since 2019. Thomas is the first South Asian and the first Indian-American to serve in the New York State Senate.

Early life and career
Born in Dubai, United Arab Emirates, Thomas immigrated to the United States as a ten-year-old boy. He received his J.D. from Western Michigan University Cooley Law School.

Thomas is an Indian-American of Malayalee descent.

Prior to elected office, Thomas was an attorney and an appointee of the US Commission on Civil Rights to the New York State Advisory Committee, a federal agency tasked with civil rights oversight. He lives in Levittown with his family.

New York Senate
In an upset victory, Thomas defeated incumbent Senator Kemp Hannon 50.8%–49.1% in the 6th Senate District in the 2018 New York State Senate elections.

Thomas was sworn in for his first term on January 1, 2019, and is serving as Chair of the Consumer Protection committee. He is the first South Asian American and the first Indian-American to serve in the New York State Senate.

In 2020, Thomas worked on a data bill entitled the “New York Privacy Act,” which would require companies to allow consumers to obtain the names of all entities with whom their information is shared and give those consumers the power to stop the company from sharing that data if they do not want it distributed.

In October 2020, Thomas secured a second term after defeating Republican challenger Dennis Dunne. Although the initial count favored Dunne, the historically large number of absentee ballots cast in the midst of the COVID-19 pandemic swung the race in Thomas's favor.

References

External links

Living people
People from Levittown, New York
Democratic Party New York (state) state senators
Indian emigrants to the United States
American politicians of Indian descent
21st-century American politicians
Asian-American people in New York (state) politics
1984 births